Orchha is a town, near city of Niwari in Niwari district of Madhya Pradesh state, India. The town was established by rajput ruler Rudra Pratap Singh some time after 1501, as the seat of an eponymous former princely state of covering parts of central & north India, in the Bundelkhand region. Orchha lies on the Betwa River, 80 km from Tikamgarh & 15 km from Jhansi in Uttar Pradesh.

History

Orchha was founded in 1531 (the 16th century AD) by the Bundela chief, Rudra Pratap Singh, who became the first King of Orchha, (r. 1501–1531) and also built the Fort of Orchha. The Chaturbhuj Temple was built by the queen of Orchha, Ganesh Kunwar (गणेश कुँवर), while Raj Mandir was built by  'Raja Madhukar Shah' during his reign, 1554 to 1591. Orchha was captured by imperial forces of the Mughal Army led by Prince Aurangzeb in October 1635.

Story about king Rama (Ram Raja) temple:
Lord Rama is regarded as the King of Orchha. Orchha is the only place in India other than Ayodhya, where lord Rama is also the King of the town. The story behind this goes like this: In 16th century, king Madhukar shah of Orchha was a devotee of Lord Krishna whereas his wife queen Kunwar Ganesh was a devotee of Lord Rama. There were always disputes due to this difference. Once king challenged the queen that if Rama really exists then bring him to Orchha. Queen went to ayodhya and prayed for 21 days with rigorous penance to lord Rama. At last Rama appeared before her in his child form and agreed to go with her with three conditions: first that he will be the only king of Orchha, there will be no other king. Second that wherever he is placed once he will remain there only and third that he will go at a particular time and with some monks. Queen accepted the conditions and thus Rama (statue representing Rama himself) was brought to Orchha. Since then Rama is the only king in Orchha. Even in the present times Rama is regarded as the only king and the guard of honour is given to him by the police every day at the Ram Raja Temple. No other VIP or minister or official behaves like a ruler when they visit Orchha. This aspect makes Orchha a unique place for devotees of lord Rama.

Places of tourist interest

On a seasonal island on the bank of the Betwa River, which has been surrounded by a battlement wall, stands a huge palace-fort. The fort consists of several connected buildings erected at different times, the most noteworthy of which is the Raja Mahal.

The Ram Raja Temple is built on a square base and has an almost entirely plain exterior, relieved by projecting windows and a line of delicate domes along the summit. The Jahangir Mahal is built on a rectangular base and is relieved by a circular tower at each corner surmounted by a dome, while two lines of graceful balconies supported on brackets mark the central storeys. The roof is crowned by eight large fluted domes, with smaller domes between them, connected by an ornamental balustrade. The Jahangir Mahal is considered to be a singularly beautiful specimen of Mughal architecture. A point worth mentioning here is that the mother of Jahangir, Mariam-uz-Zamani, was a Rajput princess. It is with this in mind that the Rajput king of Orchha had built the Jahangir Mahal. There is a spectacular light and sound show in the evening hours in the Jahangir Mahal. The show displays the history of the city of Orchha and the Jahangir Mahal. Chaturbhuj Temple is an old temple from the 9th century, and is noted for having one of the tallest Vimana among Hindu temples standing at 344 feet.

The Uth Khana (Camel Shelter) where the King's camels were stationed is right next to the fort and is a must-see. Tourists can also climb on the roof of the Uth Khana and get a fantastic view of Orchha town. The ruins behind the fort complex are an even greater sight. It makes a tourist travel back in time and is an integral part of a visit to Orchha. It houses the residences of various military officers, ministers (housing, roads), gunpowder factory, etc.

Numerous cenotaphs or chhatris dot the vicinity of the fort and the Betwa river. Elsewhere about the town there is an unusual variety of temples and tombs, including the Chaturbhuj temple, which is built on a vast platform of stone. The more unguarded and neglected of these buildings are popular hangouts for tropical bees, wasps, and other such excitable stinging creatures.

In 2006, Orchha's buildings were being documented by the LIK Team of IIT Roorkee, India.

A community radio station, Radio Bundelkhand was launched in Orchha on 23 October 2008. It is an initiative of the Development Alternatives Group. The radio station broadcasts daily programs in the Bundeli dialect and devotes significant amount of its broadcast time to local issues, culture, education and the rich tradition of Bundeli folk music. The station is available on 90.4 MHz.

Demographics
 India census, Orchha had a population of 8501. Males constitute 53% of the population and females 47%. Orchha has an average literacy rate of 54%, lower than the national average of 59.5%: male literacy is 64%, and female literacy is 42%, 18% of the population is under 6 years of age.

Accessibility
Nearest Airport to Orchha is Gwalior Airport.

Orchha is 170 km km and 3 hours drive from Khajuraho Airport which is well connected with other metropolitan cities in India.

Orchha Railway station is Jhansi-Manikpur section of the North Central Railways. 15 km from Jhansi in Uttar Pradesh, Orchha also lies close to another popular tourist destination, Khajuraho.

Tourists who wish to visit Orchha from Khajuraho can catch the morning express which leaves at around 8 or 9 AM. Alternatively, they could also avail the afternoon express which leaves at around 12 or 1 PM. The train journey from Khajuraho is 5 hours and they will ideally have to get off at Jhansi and grab an autorickshaw or Tuk Tuk for Orchha (costs INR 400). However, if the train halts at Orchha, they can also get off at the Orchha station and grab an autorickshaw to the temple complex.

See also
Orchha Fort complex
Cafe NoMads Orchha https://maps.app.goo.gl/hpmf6BMCgad13GsS9

References

External link

Documentation of orchha buildings by IIT Roorkee
Genealogy of the ruling chiefs of Orchha
 
Travelogue and photos of Orchha
Orchha: the erstwhile capital of Bundelkhand
Pictures
Orchha Photo Gallery
Orchha Photo Gallery with over 50 Pictures 2009
Orchha pictures on OrientalQuest

 
Populated places established in 1531
Cities and towns in Niwari district
Bundelkhand
Tourism in Madhya Pradesh
1531 establishments in India